A list of chapters of the Alpha Sigma Kappa sorority.

Date chapter installed in parentheses

 University of Minnesota (May 1, 1989) (founding chapter)
 University of Oklahoma (September 13, 1997)
 University of Louisville (April 1, 2000) (inactive chapter)
 University of Texas at Arlington (October 27, 2001) (inactive chapter)
 Iowa State University (October 23, 2004)
 University of Maryland, Baltimore County (March 5, 2005)
 New Mexico Institute of Mining and Technology (December 4, 2010)
 Colorado State University (March 28, 2015)
 University of New Haven (March 5, 2016)
 The University of Kansas (April 16, 2016)
 DePaul University (January 26, 2019) (inactive chapter)
 University of Richmond (April 14, 2018)
 University of Central Florida (September 15, 2018)
 University of California, Santa Barbara (February 9, 2019)
 Virginia Tech (November 16, 2019)
 Boston University (February 12, 2022)
 University of South Florida (October 2, 2021)

A list of colonies of the Alpha Sigma Kappa sorority.

 University of Tennessee (April 2, 2022)

A list of interest groups of the Alpha Sigma Kappa sorority.
Florida Gulf Coast University 
University of Pittsburgh

External links 
 Active Chapter listing

Alpha Sigma Kappa
chapters